Rudolf Beran (28 December 1887, in Pracejovice, Strakonice District – 23 April 1954, in Leopoldov Prison) was a Czechoslovak politician who served as prime minister of the country before its occupation by Nazi Germany and shortly thereafter, before it was declared a protectorate. A leader of the Agrarian Party from 1933, he was appointed prime minister by President Emil Hácha on 1 December 1938.

Beran was somewhat ambivalent toward democracy. In the hope of appeasing the Germans after the Munich Agreement, he gathered most of the nonsocialist parties in the Czech lands into the Party of National Unity, with himself as its leader. He also subjected the press to tough censorship, but he presided over granting the Slovaks and Ruthenians' longstanding demands for autonomy. None of the measures was enough to prevent Slovakia from seceding on 14 March, or Germany from occupying the remainder of the country a day later. He then served as the first prime minister of the Protectorate of Bohemia and Moravia until his retirement on 27 April 1939. After he retired, he settled on his farm. During World War II, he had contacts with members of the Czech resistance.

He was arrested in May 1941 by the Germans and spent years in various concentration camps. While he was in custody of the Gestapo in Prague, he had to answer several written questions submitted to him by K.H. Frank, Hitler's Staatsminister of the Protectorate of Bohemia and Moravia. 

After the war, Beran was arrested as a collaborator by the Communist authorities, and in a manipulated political trial was sentenced to twenty years in prison. He died in Leopoldov Prison in 1954.

References

External links
  
  
 
Literature:
KULÍŠEK, Vítězslav, Politika druhé republiky (1938–1939): aneb první kolaps československé demokracie, Brno 2020, 
 https://kulisek-spisovatel.webnode.cz/politikadruherepubliky/

1887 births
1954 deaths
People from Strakonice District
People from the Kingdom of Bohemia
Republican Party of Farmers and Peasants politicians
Party of National Unity (Czechoslovakia) politicians
Prime Ministers of Czechoslovakia
Prime Ministers of the Protectorate of Bohemia and Moravia
Members of the Revolutionary National Assembly of Czechoslovakia
Members of the Chamber of Deputies of Czechoslovakia (1920–1925)
Members of the Chamber of Deputies of Czechoslovakia (1925–1929)
Members of the Chamber of Deputies of Czechoslovakia (1929–1935)
Members of the Chamber of Deputies of Czechoslovakia (1935–1939)
Czech anti-communists
Czech people of World War II
Prisoners who died in Czechoslovak detention
Czechoslovak people who died in prison custody